The Regius Professor of Surgery is a Regius Professorship held at the University of Dublin, Trinity College. The seat was created as University Professor of Surgery in 1852, and was made a Regius Professorship by Queen Victoria in 1868. It is not currently occupied.

Holders

University Professor of Surgery
 James William Cusack (1852)
 Robert Adams (1861)

Regius Professor of Surgery
 Robert Adams (1868)
 William Colles (1875)
 Sir George Porter, 1st Baronet (1891)
 Sir Charles Ball, 1st Baronet (1895)
 Edward Henry Taylor (1916)
 William Taylor (1922)
 Sir Charles Ball, 2nd Baronet (1933)
 Adams Andrew McConnell (1946)
 John Seton Pringle (1961)
 Nigel Kinnear (1967)
 Stanley McCollum (1973)
 Thomas P.J. Hennessy (1984)

References
Department of Surgery: History at School of Medicine website (mirrored at Internet Archive)

1852 establishments in Ireland
Professorships at Trinity College Dublin
Professorships in medicine
Surgery